Markles is an unincorporated community in southern Otter Creek Township, Vigo County, in the U.S. state of Indiana. Within the boundaries of Terre Haute, it is also part of the Terre Haute metropolitan area.

The town is home to Markles Cemetery.

Geography

References

Unincorporated communities in Indiana
Unincorporated communities in Vigo County, Indiana
Terre Haute metropolitan area